Mount Daxue is a mountain in Taiwan along the Xueshan Range with an elevation of .

The Dasyueshan National Forest Recreation Area in Heping District, Taichung, contains a section of Dasyueshan, consisting of several shorter peaks, with Siaosyueshan (Little Snow Mountain) being the tallest at 2997m. Formerly a logging area, many of the affected areas have been reforested and it has become a popular scenic destination and birdwatching spot. Bird species seen here include the Mikado pheasant, Swinhoe's pheasant, and Taiwan partridge.

See also 
List of mountains in Taiwan

References

Landforms of Taichung 
Daxue